Guangdong-Hong Kong Cup 1978–79 is the 1st staging of this two-leg competition between Hong Kong and Guangdong.

The first leg was played in Guangzhou on 21 January 1979 while the second leg was played in Hong Kong Stadium on 28 January 1979.

Guangdong captured the first champion of this competitive by winning an aggregate 4–1 against Hong Kong.

Squads

Hong Kong
 Coach:  Lo Tak Kuen

Guangdong
Guangdong team consists of 17 players.
 Cai Jinbiao 蔡錦標
 Wu Zhiying 吳志英
 He Jia 何佳
 Chen Xirong 陳熙榮
 Ou Weiteng 歐偉庭
 Gu Guangming 古廣明
 Rong Zhixing 容志行
 Yang Fusheng 楊福生
 Ye Xiquan 葉細權
 Du Qing'en 杜慶恩
 He Jinlun 何錦倫
 Xie Zhiguang 謝志光

Trivia
 Ou Weiteng of Guangdong team scored after 4 minutes and this is the first goal of the competition.
 Second leg was played on the first day of Chinese New Year.

Results
First Leg

Second Leg

References
 HKFA website 省港盃回憶錄(一) (in Chinese)
 HKFA website 省港盃回憶錄(二) (in Chinese)
 Takungpao, 1979-01-27, page 12
 Wah Kiu Yat Po, 1979-01-30, section 3 page 4 (total page 12)

See also
 1979 Lunar New Year Cup

Guan
Guangdong–Hong Kong Cup
1979 in Chinese football